Farrville is an unincorporated community in Van Buren Township, Grant County, Indiana.

History
A post office was established at Farrville in 1887, and remained in operation until it was discontinued in 1902. Alfred Farr served as first postmaster.

Geography

References

Unincorporated communities in Grant County, Indiana
Unincorporated communities in Indiana